Small Wonders (also known as Fiddlefest) is a 1995 American documentary film about Roberta Guaspari, a music teacher in East Harlem who teaches underprivileged children how to play the violin. Produced and directed by Allan Miller, it was nominated for an Academy Award for Best Documentary Feature.

Participants
 Roberta Guaspari
 Arnold Steinhardt
 Isaac Stern
 Itzhak Perlman
 Deborah Meyer
 Sid Massey
 Kyle Haver
 Barry Solowey
 Lucy Matos

See also
Music of the Heart, a 1999 drama film based on Small Wonders

References

External links

1995 films
1995 documentary films
American documentary films
Documentary films about music and musicians
Documentary films about education in the United States
Documentary films about New York City
Films set in Harlem
East Harlem
1990s English-language films
1990s American films